Reserve Military Training Units (RMTU) are a component of the reserve forces of North Korea.

Overview
The RMTU, which was formed in 1963 consist of 17 to 50 year old males and 17 to 30 year old females who finished their mandatory military service or do not serve for some reason. When males reach age 46, they are assigned to the Worker-Peasant Red Guards. The RTMU contains between 600,000 to 620,000 members in 37 RMTU divisions. The RMTU keeps the highest level of training among North Korea's reserve forces and its members are requested to have at least 500 of intensive annual training. According to some sources, the RMTU are under the control of the Ministry of Defense in both peace and emergency state which controls them from the General Staff through the corps headquarters to their subordinated RMTU units.

See also
Worker-Peasant Red Guards
Social Security Forces
Korean People's Army
Law enforcement in North Korea
Red Youth Guards

References

Reserve forces
Military of North Korea
Military units and formations established in the 1960s